Princess Wilhelmine Louise Christine of Saxe-Meiningen (6 August 1752 in Frankfurt – 3 June 1805 in Kassel) was a Duchess of Saxe-Meiningen by birth and by marriage Landgravine of Hesse-Philippsthal-Barchfeld.

Life 
Louise was a daughter of Duke Anton Ulrich of Sachsen-Meiningen (1687-1763) from his second marriage to Charlotte Amalie (1730 - 1801), daughter of the Landgrave Charles I of Hesse-Philippsthal.

Louise married on 18 October 1781 in Meiningen to Landgrave Adolph of Hesse-Philippsthal-Barchfeld (1743-1803).  Even in her marriage contract, which her mother, acting as regent for her brother, Duke Charles William of Saxe-Meiningen, concluded with Landgrave Adolph, it was stipulated that his future wife is the sole guardian of her underage children and administrator of their assets.  After Adolph died in 1803, Louise presented this contract to the Reichskammergericht and this court confirmed her guardianship over her three sons.

Issue 
From her marriage Louise had the following children:
 Frederick (1782-1783)
 Charles (1784-1854), Landgrave of Hesse-Philippsthal-Barchfeld, married
 in 1816 to Princess Auguste of Hohenlohe-Ingelfingen (1793-1821)
 in 1823 to Princess Sophie of Bentheim and Steinfurt (1794-1873)
 William (1786-1834), married in 1812 Princess Juliane Sophie of Denmark (1788-1850)
 George (1787-1788)
 Ernest Frederick (1789-1850); never married
 Charlotte (1794-1794)

References 
 Pauline Puppel: Die Regentin: vormundschaftliche Herrschaft in Hessen 1500-1700, Campus Verlag, Frankfurt am Main, 2004, p. 47 (Online)

House of Wettin
House of Saxe-Meiningen
1752 births
1805 deaths
Landgravines of Hesse-Kassel
18th-century German people
People from Frankfurt
Daughters of monarchs